Alfredo Trombetti (16 January 1866, in Bologna – 5 July 1929, in Venice), was an Italian linguist active in the early 20th century.

Career overview
Trombetti was a professor at the University of Bologna. He was a member of the Italian Academy.

He is best known as an advocate of the doctrine of monogenesis, according to which all of the world's languages go back to a single common ancestral language. His arguments for monogenesis were first presented in his book L'unità d'origine del linguaggio, published in 1905. This doctrine is still extremely controversial.

Proposed etymologies
A selection of Trombetti's proposed global etymologies:

{| class="wikitable"
! Meaning !! Root
|-
| to hear; ear || kul (kur)
|-
| water || ma; wad (wad, wed, wod), ud
|-
| dog || ku (ku-ari, ku-ri, etc.)
|-
| hair || tuk, suk
|-
| behind, back || kata, taka
|-
| foot || ganga; pat
|-
| earth (clay, ash) || tu
|-
| dust || twar, tur (< tu 'earth')
|-
| woman || na (nai)
|-
| man (person) || ku, etc.
|-
| man (male) || mar
|-
| egg (testicle) || umu (mu-n, mu-r, etc.)
|}

Selected works
 1902-1903. "Delle relazioni delle lingue caucasiche con le lingue camitosemitiche e con altri gruppi linguistichi. Lettera al professore H. Schuchardt." In Giornale della Società asiatica italiana, T. 15, pp. 177–201 and T. 16, pp. 145–175. Florence.
 1902. Nessi genealogici fra le lingue del mondo antîco, 4 volumes, unpublished. Recipient of the Royal Prize of the Italian Academy in 1902.
 1905. L'unità d'origine del linguaggio. Bologna: Luigi Beltrami.
 1907. Come si fa la critica di un libro. Con nuovi contributi alla dottrina della monogenesi del linguaggio e alla glottologia generale comparata. Bologna: Luigi Beltrami.
 1908. Saggi di glottologia generale comparata I. I pronomi personali. Accademia delle scienze dell'Istituto di Bologna. Classe de scienze morali. Bologna.
 1912. Manuale dell'arabo parlato a Tripoli. Grammatica, letture e vocabolario. Bologna: Luigi Beltrami.
 1913. Saggi di glottologia generale comparata II. I numerali. Accademia delle scienze dell'Istituto di Bologna. Classe de scienze morali. Bologna.
 1920. Saggi di glottologia generale comparata III. Comparazioni lessicali. Accademia delle scienze dell'Istituto di Bologna. Classe de scienze morali. Bologna.
 1922-1923. Elementi di glottologia, 2 volumes. Bologna: Zanichelli.
 1925. Le origini della lingua basca. Bologna: Azzoguidi.
 1927. "La lingua etrusca e le lingue preindoeuropee del Meditarreneo." In Studi etruschi, T. 1. Florence.
 1928. La lingua etrusca. Florence: Rinascimento del libro.
 1928. "Origine asiatica delle lingue e popolazioni americane." In Atti del 22 congresso internazionale degli americanisti, Roma, Settembre 1926, T. 1, pp. 169–246. Rome: Istituto Cristoforo Colombo.
 1929. Il nostro dialetto bolognese. Bologna: Zanichelli.

See also 
 Dené–Yeniseian languages

References

External links

 

Linguists from Italy
Paleolinguists
1866 births
1929 deaths
Members of the Royal Academy of Italy
Long-range comparative linguists
People from Bologna
Academic staff of the University of Bologna
Linguists of Proto-Human language